The following is a list of episodes for the second arc of Toei Animation's Digimon Fusion anime series. It is known in Japan as Digimon Xros Wars: The Evil Death Generals and the Seven Kingdoms (デジモンクロスウォーズ 〜悪のデスジェネラルと七つの王国〜 Aku no Desu Jeneraru to Nanatsu no Ōkoku). The second arc started airing on TV Asahi in Japan on April 5, 2011. 

At the 2014 Licensing Expo, Saban confirmed that Digimon Fusion season 2 would be dubbed into English. On March 8, 2015, Digimon Fusion season 2 aired in the U.S. on Nicktoons.

The opening theme for this arc is "New World" by Twill. The series also features original music by Kousuke Yamashita as well as various insert songs sung by Kōji Wada.


List of episodes

References

External links
TV Asahi's official The Evil Death Generals and the Seven Kingdoms website
 Toei Animation's official Digimon Xros Wars  website

2011 Japanese television seasons
Fusion (season 2)